Landini may refer to
Landini (surname)
Francesco Landini
Landini (tractor) produced by the Italian company Landini SpA
Landini cadence, a technique in music composition named after composer Francesco Landini